The 2022–23 FC DAC 1904 Dunajská Streda season was the club's 19th season in the Slovak Super Liga and 10th consecutive. DAC competed in the Fortuna Liga, Europa Conference League and Slovak Cup.

Players

Transfers and loans

Transfers out

Loans out

Friendlies

Pre-season

Competition overview

Fortuna Liga

Regular stage

Results summary

League table

Results by round

Matches

UEFA Europa Conference League

First qualifying round

Second Qualifying Round

Thirds Qualifying Round

Slovak Cup

Statistics

Appearances and goals
Italics indicate a loaned player

|-
! colspan=14 style="background:#dcdcdc; text-align:center| Goalkeepers

|-
! colspan=14 style="background:#dcdcdc; text-align:center| Defenders

|-
! colspan=14 style="background:#dcdcdc; text-align:center| Midfielders

|-
! colspan=14 style="background:#dcdcdc; text-align:center| Forwards
|}

Goalscorers

References

External links 
 Official website
 www.futbalnet.sk

FC DAC 1904 Dunajská Streda seasons
DAC Dunajská Streda
DAC Dunajská Streda